Events from the year 1809 in Canada.

Incumbents
Monarch: George III

Parliaments of Canada
Parliament of Lower Canada: 5th (April 10 – May 18)
Parliament of Upper Canada: 5th (starting February 2)

Governors
Governor of the Canadas: Robert Milnes
Governor of New Brunswick: Thomas Carleton
Governor of Nova Scotia: John Wentworth
Commodore-Governor of Newfoundland: John Holloway
Governor of Prince Edward Island: Joseph Frederick Wallet DesBarres

Events
 On August 17, the foundation of Nelson's Column, Montreal was laid.
 November 3: John Molson's steamboat, PS Accommodation, starts for Quebec City. It is  overall, has a  engine, and makes the distance in 36 hours, but stops at night and reaches Quebec on November 6. The Accommodation is the second steamboat in America, and probably the world.
 From 1809 to 1811, Tecumseh, Shawnee chief, and the Prophet campaign to unite tribes of the Great Lakes, Ohio Valley, and Southeast against the United States. His brother Tenskwatawa, the Shawnee Prophet, is defeated at the Battle of Tippecanoe in 1811.
 Napoleon's continental blockade cuts British access to Scandinavian timber.
 The North West Company builds Fort Gibraltar.

Births

January 31 – Lemuel Allan Wilmot, lawyer, politician, judge, and  3rd Lieutenant Governor of New Brunswick (d.1878)
March 27 – Jean-Louis Beaudry, entrepreneur, politician and 11th Mayor of Montreal (d.1886)
May 15 – Pierre-Eustache Dostaler, farmer and politician (d.1884) 
June 15 – François-Xavier Garneau, notary, civil servant, poet and historian (d.1866)
July 25 – Jonathan McCully, politician (d.1877)
October 11 – Modeste Demers, missionary (d.1871)
November 15 – Charles La Rocque, priest and third Bishop of Saint-Hyacinthe (d.1875)
November 24 – Amos Wright, farmer and politician (d.1886)

Deaths
July 3 – Joseph Quesnel, musician (b. 1746)

References

 
Canada
09
1809 in North America